Cristo Rey Dallas College Prep is a coeducational, Catholic, college preparatory school and a member of the Cristo Rey Network that follows the  work-study model of education. The first criterion for admission is financial need, and the school is designed for students who cannot otherwise afford a college prep education.

History
The school is located in the Pleasant Grove area of Southeast Dallas at 1064 N. St. Augustine, the former site of St. Augustine Catholic School.

References

External links
 Cristo Rey Network
 Fr. John P. Foley honored with Presidential Citizen's Medal
60 minutes
Aljazeera, America Tonight
Cristo Rey Featured in WashPost column by George Will
 Boston Globe - With sense of purpose, students cut class for a day 
 Bill & Melinda Gates Foundation - Success of Innovative Urban Catholic School Sparks Major Investment

Cristo Rey Network
Educational institutions established in 2015
Catholic secondary schools in Texas
Poverty-related organizations
2015 establishments in Texas